2011 Universiade may refer to:

2011 Summer Universiade, a summer sporting event held in Shenzhen
2011 Winter Universiade, a winter sporting event held in Erzurum